Aradidae is a family of flat bugs, and a member of true bugs (Heteroptera). The common name for these insects refers to their dorsoventrally flattened bodies. With few exceptions, these cryptic insects are of no economic importance.  

This family occurs worldwide, with the most diversity occurring in Australia. 

Temperate species commonly live under the bark of dead trees, while many tropical species are found in leaf litter or on fallen twigs or branches.

Most members of the family are thought to be mycophagous (fungus eating), but little is known of the feeding habits of most species. They can be attracted to the pheromones of bark beetles.  Many of the tropical taxa are apterous.  Flat bugs are distant relatives of the more familiar stink bugs.

External links
Video of a cryptic Flat Bug (Dysodius Lunatus, Aradidae) on a dead tree bark
International Heteropterist's Society
Checklist of North American Aradidae

 https://bugguide.net/node/view/9317

Aradoidea
Heteroptera families
Taxa named by Maximilian Spinola